Dyrøy is a municipality in Troms og Finnmark county, Norway. The administrative centre of the municipality is the village of Brøstadbotn. Other villages include Dyrøyhamn, Espenes, Holm, and Hundstrand.

The  municipality is the 270th largest by area out of the 356 municipalities in Norway. Dyrøy is the 328th most populous municipality in Norway with a population of 1,068.

The municipality is named after the island of Dyrøya, which is connected with the mainland with the modern Dyrøy Bridge. Most people, however, don't live on the island, but live in Brøstadbotn on the mainland.

General information

The municipality of Dyrøy was established on 1 September 1886, when it was separated from the municipality of Tranøy. The initial population of Dyrøy was 1,281. During the 1960s, there were many municipal mergers across Norway due to the work of the Schei Committee. On 1 January 1964, the parts of Tranøy Municipality located on the mainland (population: 382) were transferred to Dyrøy.

On 1 January 2020, the municipality became part of the newly formed Troms og Finnmark county. Previously, it had been part of the old Troms county.

Name
The municipality (originally the parish) is named after the island of Dyrøya (Old Norse: Dýrøy), since the first Dyrøy Church was built there. The first element is dýr which means "deer" (specifically reindeer) and the last element is øy which means "island". Prior to 1909, the name was written Dyrø.

Coat of arms
The coat of arms was granted on 4 April 1986. The official blazon is "Azure, a fox statant argent". This means the arms have a blue field (background) and the charge is a locally-bred platinum fox. The fox has a tincture of argent which means it is commonly colored white, but if it is made out of metal, then silver is used. The fur industry has had a long tradition in Dyrøy and in the 1930s, a special sort of arctic fox was bred there which was called the platinum fox. The arms were designed by Svein A. Berntsen.

Churches
The Church of Norway has one parish within the municipality of Dyrøy. It is part of the Senja prosti (deanery) in the Diocese of Nord-Hålogaland.

Geography
The municipality is located on the island of Dyrøya and the mainland area to the east, with the Dyrøy Bridge connecting the island to the mainland. The Vågsfjorden, Tranøyfjorden, and Solbergfjorden flow along the western and northern border of the municipality.

The municipality is mountainous with a narrow beach area along the coast. On the mainland, the Bjørkebakkdalen valley leads south from the municipal center Brøstadbotn.

Climate

Government
All municipalities in Norway, including Dyrøy, are responsible for primary education (through 10th grade), outpatient health services, senior citizen services, unemployment and other social services, zoning, economic development, and municipal roads. The municipality is governed by a municipal council of elected representatives, which in turn elect a mayor.  The municipality falls under the Senja District Court and the Hålogaland Court of Appeal.

Municipal council
The municipal council  of Dyrøy is made up of 15 representatives that are elected to four year terms. The party breakdown of the council is as follows:

References

External links

Municipal fact sheet from Statistics Norway

 
Municipalities of Troms og Finnmark
Populated places of Arctic Norway
1886 establishments in Norway